Bindig is a surname. Notable people with the surname include:

Bob Bindig (1920–2007), American cartoonist and comics historian
Rudolf Bindig (born 1940), German politician